The South and East Wales Air Support Unit was a consortium established to provide police aviation for South Wales Police and Gwent Police. It was managed by Inspector Gary Smart and operated a Eurocopter EC135 from MOD St Athan in the Vale of Glamorgan.

It has been replaced by the National Police Air Service.

See also
 Police aviation
 Police aviation in the United Kingdom

References

Police aviation units of the United Kingdom
Defunct organisations based in the United Kingdom